Fort Wayne Street Bridge, also known as the County Bridge #403 and Indiana Avenue Bridge, is a historic Pennsylvania truss bridge located at Goshen, Elkhart County, Indiana.  It was built in 1896 by the Bellefontaine Bridge & Iron Co. and spans the Elkhart River.  The bridge measures 180 feet long and has a 23-foot-wide roadway.

It was added to the National Register of Historic Places in 2005.

References

External links

Road bridges on the National Register of Historic Places in Indiana
Bridges completed in 1896
Transportation buildings and structures in Elkhart County, Indiana
National Register of Historic Places in Elkhart County, Indiana
Pennsylvania truss bridges in the United States